The 1895–96 season was Stoke's seventh season in the Football League.

Stoke enjoyed their best season yet under new manager Bill Rowley finishing in 6th position with 30 points. Stoke only drew one game this season and that came in the FA Cup against Burnley.

Season Review

League
In the summer of 1895 the club had become a Limited liability company and long serving goalkeeper Bill Rowley was given the position of secretary-manager. One of Rowley's best pieces of business was to bring William Maxwell to the club from Dundee. Maxwell went on to score 75 goals in 156 matches in six seasons with Stoke.
Before the start of the season, there was a mini-exodus of players to Southampton St. Mary's such as Jack Farrell, Samuel Meston, Willie Naughton and trainer Bill Dawson. Some players would later return to Stoke after their spell on the south coast.

One of Stoke's most bizarre transfer deals took place in February 1896 when they signed Allan Maxwell from Darwen. Instead of requesting a transfer fee Darwen wanted a set of wrought iron gates to be supplied by Stoke. On the pitch Stoke finished their highest position yet of sixth place, picking up 30 points in the process. No league draw was forthcoming for Stoke their only draw came in the FA Cup against Burnley.

FA Cup
For the second season running Stoke were knocked out of the FA Cup by Wolverhampton Wanderers this time 3–0 in the third round. Prior to this Stoke were in free scoring form beating Tottenham Hotspur 5–0 and Burnley 7–1.

Final league table

Results
Stoke's score comes first

Legend

Football League First Division

FA Cup

Squad statistics

References

Stoke City F.C. seasons
Stoke